Walter Moffitt Marks (6 June 1875 – 31 March 1951) was an Australian lawyer and politician. He served as a member of the House of Representatives from 1919 to 1931, representing the Division of Wentworth in New South Wales.

Early life
Marks was born in Culwulla House, Jamberoo, New South Wales and educated at Sydney Grammar School.  He was admitted as a solicitor in 1902.  In September 1901 he married Florence Sandford.  As a result of an inheritance in 1912, he was able to partly finance the building of his chambers, the twelve-storey Culwulla Chambers in Castlereagh Street, Sydney, the tallest building in central Sydney until after World War II.  He won most major Australian yachting trophies in Culwulla I-IV, and participated in the trials of Sir Thomas Lipton's America's Cup challenger, Shamrock IV in 1914.  In World War I he joined the Royal Navy Volunteer Reserve and served as a lieutenant in the North Sea and English Channel, commanded a gunnery school in Wales and returned to Australia in 1918 to encourage military recruitment.

Politics

Marks was elected to parliament at the 1919 federal election, winning the Division of Wentworth as a Nationalist.

In a speech to the House of Representatives on 3 November 1921, Marks predicted that Armageddon would occur in 1934. He said that the Bible had foretold that a great battle would be fought in Jerusalem between the British Empire on one side and Germany, Russia and another great nation on the other side. This would be followed by the Second Coming of Christ, who would direct the Royal Navy to collect his chosen people from around the world and bring them to Palestine.

Marks had been considered for promotion to a ministerial post, but was passed over. The Sydney Morning Herald noted that "his utterances regarding Armageddon are believed to have interfered with his prospects". However, in December 1921 he was appointed by Billy Hughes to the position of undersecretary in the Prime Minister's Department, assisting the departmental secretary Percy Deane and also answering questions on behalf of the prime minister in the House of Representatives. He received no official salary in the position, but additional compensation was paid to him out of the salaries of the ministers. Stanley Bruce abolished the position when he succeeded Hughes as prime minister in 1923.

Marks took a strong interest in foreign affairs, aviation and the film industry.  He was one of seven Nationalists – including Hughes – who voted to bring down the Bruce Government, forcing the 1929 election. Although he lost Nationalist Party endorsement, he was re-elected as an independent. Shortly after the election, he joined Hughes' new Australian Party. However, his time there was short-lived, as he resigned in September 1930 over policy differences and returned to sit as an independent. Marks joined the new United Australia Party on its formation in May 1931, but was defeated at the 1931 election by another UAP candidate, Eric Harrison.

Later life

Marks returned to his law practice after losing his seat. In 1937, he became the inaugural chairman of the Papuan Apinaipi Petroleum Company. He was commodore of the Royal Prince Alfred Yacht Club for seven years. Marks died at the age of 75, following surgery in the Sydney suburb of Paddington. He was survived by a son and a daughter.

Notes

Nationalist Party of Australia members of the Parliament of Australia
United Australia Party members of the Parliament of Australia
Members of the Australian House of Representatives for Wentworth
1875 births
1951 deaths
Royal Navy officers of World War I
America's Cup sailors
Independent members of the Parliament of Australia
Australian Party members of the Parliament of Australia
20th-century Australian politicians